Hiroshi V. Yamamura is a Marshallese politician and government minister. As of 2014 he was Minister of Public Works and Acting Minister of Resources and Development.

References

 
Public works ministers of the Marshall Islands
Marshallese politicians
Living people
Year of birth missing (living people)